George Augustus "Gerald" O'Dwyer (24 September 1872 – 18 September 1908) was an Australian rules footballer who played with Carlton in the Victorian Football League (VFL).

Notes

External links 

Gerald O'Dwyer's profile at Blueseum

Australian rules footballers from Melbourne
Fremantle Football Club (1881–1899) players
Carlton Football Club players
1872 births
1908 deaths
People from South Melbourne